A landlocked parcel is a real estate plot that has no legal access to a public right of way. Generally, a landlocked parcel has less value than a parcel that is not landlocked. Often, the owner of a landlocked parcel can obtain access to a public roadway by easement.

Thailand Section 1349

Any plot of land is surrounded by other plots of land until there is no exit to reach the public way. The owner of that plot of land may pass through the surrounding land to the public way.
Any plot of land has a way out, but when it has to cross a pond, pond or sea, or there is a steep slope that is much higher than the land level and the public way. He said to use the provisions in the preceding paragraph.
The place and method of making the passage must be chosen as appropriate to the necessity of the person entitled to transit. with regard to the land surrounding it to cause as little damage as possible If necessary, the person entitled to transit may construct a road as a passageway.
The person entitled to pass must pay compensation to the owner of the enclosing land for damage caused by the occurrence of such passage. Compensation is in addition to the damage caused by road construction. You can set it as an annual payment.

See also 
 Landlocked country

References 

Real estate